Bruno Vanryb was the BV of BVRP, a Paris-based company he co-founded with Roger Politis in 1984. He was a French entrepreneur (1957 - January 12, 2019).
He was the founder and former CEO of Avanquest, a worldwide software company. He headed Be Brave, a consultancy firm.

Biography
Vanryb was a former sound engineer and tech journalist (SVM, Micro Systèmes and Soft & Micro particular), and author of twelve books on micro-computers.

In 1984, he cofounded BVRP with Roger Politis, which became Avanquest, a leading software publisher in France and around the world. In January 2014, it counted 530 employees in seven countries. One of the flagship products of the company was a fax software named WinFax. He was CEO, then Executive Chairman of Avanquest until June 2015.

He was also very active in the French digital and innovation ecosystem. Vanryb participated with Denis Payre in the foundation of an association called Croissance Plus, which supports and ensures awareness of growing companies in France, an association he chaired between 1998 and 2000. From 2002 to 2005, Vanryb was President of Middlenext, an association whose members are medium-sized companies, listed on Euronext, Paris stock exchange. In July 2007, Bruno Vanryb was appointed to the Board of Directors of Euronext Paris until 2014. From 2010 to 2015, he was also vice-president of Syntec Numérique, which represents 1,100 member companies and groups, among whom 50% are software companies. Between April 2011 and July 2012, he was also a member and vice-president of the Conseil national du numérique, a consultative group created by French president Nicolas Sarkozy to advise him on digital issues.

Since 2016, Vanryb joined the M&A boutique Avolta Partners as Senior Partner.

Bruno Vanryb died of a motorcycle accident on January 12, 2019.

Notes and references

External links 
  

French businesspeople
French audio engineers
1957 births
2019 deaths